is a train station in the city of Nakatsugawa, Gifu Prefecture, Japan, operated by the Third-sector railway operator Akechi Railway.

Lines

Station layout
Agi Station has one side platform serving a single bi-directional track. The station building also houses a dentist office.

Adjacent stations

|-
!colspan=5|Akechi Railway

History
Agi Station opened on May 24, 1933.

Surrounding area
Agi High School

See also
 List of Railway Stations in Japan

External links

 

Railway stations in Gifu Prefecture
Railway stations in Japan opened in 1933
Stations of Akechi Railway
Nakatsugawa, Gifu